The A274 is a major road running through mid Kent. The northern end of the road is in Maidstone, at the Wheatsheaf public house where it leaves the A229. The road then follows a south easterly route to Langley, where it changes to a south south easterly alignment through Sutton Valence and Headcorn, ending at a junction with the A262 in Biddenden.

The A274 was originally classified B2078 and was re-designated in the 1950s. The road has seen some upgrades to short sections at Park Wood (on the outskirts of Maidstone) and to the south of Sutton Valence.

References

Roads in Kent